Höchstadt an der Aisch, commonly known as Höchstadt, is a town in the Erlangen-Höchstadt district, in Bavaria, Germany.

Geography
Höchstadt is situated on the river Aisch, 18 km northwest of Erlangen and 22 km south of Bamberg. Originally it was the capital of the Höchstadt district, but then it became part of the new Erlangen-Höchstadt district.

Division of the town
The town consists of 23 districts:

Leisure

Food
Carp is a very important food, but only in the months with an "r" (September, October, November, December, January, February, March, April). There are various carp dishes: e.g., "blue carp", "baked carp" and "pepper carp". Carp eaten there is termed "Aischgründer Karpfen".

Culture
There is an events centre (converted from a former shoe factory) that includes a music school and a library; there is an evening event most days.

Sport
The sports club HK Zubr Höchstadt Aisch won the German Bandy Championship in its first season, 2014/15.

See also
Realschule Hoechstadt

References

External links
  
 Webcam of a storks' nest

Erlangen-Höchstadt